K-1 Andy Memorial 2001 Japan GP Final was a martial arts event promoted by the K-1 organization, named in honour of K-1 legend Andy Hug who had died the previous year.   It was an elimination tournament involving eight fighters based in Japan, with all bouts being fought under K-1 Rules (100 kg/156-220 lbs) and the winner qualifying for the K-1 World Grand Prix 2001.  Six of these fighters had qualified via the earlier K-1 Survival 2001 event while holder Musashi had qualified as last years winner and long time Tokyo resident Nicholas Pettas was a foreign invitee.  As well as tournament bouts there were a number of local and international bouts, including special 'Andy Memorial Matches', with matches fought under either K-1 or MMA Rules.  In total there were twenty two fighters at the event, representing nine countries.

The tournament champion was Nicholas Pettas who defeated Musashi in the final by extra round unanimous decision.  As a result of the tournament Nicholas Pettas would qualify for the K-1 World Grand Prix 2001.  The event was held at the Saitama Super Arena, in Saitama, Japan on Sunday, August 19, 2001.

K-1 Andy Memorial 2001 Japan GP Final Tournament

Results 

Opening Match: K-1 Rules / 3Min. 3R Ext.2R
Masahide Aoyagi  vs Hiraku Hori 
Hori defeated Aoyagi by 3rd Round Unanimous Decision 3-0

Andy Memorial Match 1: K-1 Rules / 3Min. 3R Ext.2R
Nobuaki Kakuda  vs Mauricio Da Silva 
Kakuda defeated Da Silva by 3rd Round Unanimous Decision 3-0

Quarter Finals: K-1 Rules / 3Min. 3R Ext.1R
Musashi  vs Toru Oishi 
Musashi defeated Oishi by 3rd Round Unanimous Decision 3-0

Great Kusatsu  vs Tsuyoshi Nakasako 
Nakasako defeated Kusatsu by 3rd Round Unanimous Decision 3-0

Yusuke Fujimoto  vs Nicholas Pettas 
Pettas defeated Fujimoto by TKO (Right Low Kick) at 2:57 of the 1st Round

Nobu Hayashi  vs Tatsufumi Tomihira 
Hayashi defeated Tomihira by KO (Right Hook) at 2:55 of the 3rd Round

Andy Memorial Match 2: K-1 Rules / 3Min. 3R Ext.2R
Hiroki Kurosawa  vs Taira Noyuki 
Noyuki defeated Kurosawa by TKO (Doctor Stoppage) at 3:00 of the 3rd Round

Semi Finals: K-1 Rules / 3Min. 3R Ext.1R
Musashi  vs Tsuyoshi Nakasako 
Musashi defeated Nakasako by 3rd Round Unanimous Decision 3-0

Nicholas Pettas  vs Nobu Hayashi 
Pettas defeated Hayashi by TKO (Right Low Kick) at 1:26 of the 1st Round

Super Fight: K-1 Rules / 3Min. 3R Ext.2R
Jérôme Le Banner  vs Marc de Wit 
Le Banner defeated de Wit by KO (Right Punch) at 1:45 of the 2nd Round

Final: K-1 Rules / 3Min. 3R Ext.2R
Musashi  vs Nicholas Pettas 
Pettas defeated Musashi by Extra Round Unanimous Decision 3-0

K-1 vs Oiki Super Fights: K-1 MMA Rules / 3Min. 5R
Rene Rooze  vs Tadao Yasuda 
Rooze defeated Yasuda by KO (Left High Kick) at 0:09 of the 3rd Round

Gary Goodridge  vs Jan Nortje 
Goodridge defeated Nortje by Submission (Arm Crush) at 1:11 of the 1st Round

Mirko Cro Cop  vs Kazuyuki Fujita 
Cro Cop defeated Fujita by TKO (Doctor Stoppage) at 0:39 of the 1st Round

See also
List of K-1 events
List of male kickboxers

References

External links
K-1 Official Website
K-1.de - Your Source for Everything K-1

Andy Memorial 2001 Japan GP Final
2001 in kickboxing
Kickboxing in Japan
Sport in Saitama (city)